Kenion is a surname. Notable people with the surname include:

Ella Kenion (born 1969), English actress
J. Graham Kenion (1871–1942), English sailor